Simon Lewicki, also known as Groove Terminator and GT, is an Australian electronic music artist.

Originally a hip-hop DJ, he eventually began spinning house music. He was featured in the 2000 Australian edition of Ministry of Sound's Club Nation series, as well as several other Ministry of Sound compilations. His song "Here Comes Another One" became the theme of the popular Australian (and worldwide) reality TV-show 'The Block' and had featured previously in the cult spoof-slasher film, Cut (1999).

Career 
Lewicki's parents founded the first community radio station in Adelaide and his mother was a radio presenter. Simon's DJing began with the casual production of mix-tapes on the weekends as a youth. He was a fan of punk rock prior to discovering electronic and dance music. The first concert Lewicki attended as a child (aged eight) was The Ramones at Thebarton Theatre in Adelaide, South Australia.

Lewicki first performed as a scratch turntablist in the Adelaide-based hip hop duo, Major Rhyme Squad.

In the early 1990s he was part of the Adelaide hip-hop group "Finger Lickin' Good" alongside DJ Madcap and Quro. Their sole release was a 1993 vinyl EP release called Illegitimate Sons of the Bastard Funk.

In 1995, Lewicki formed Hoops Inc. with Steven Hooper and released two singles.

By the late 1990s, Groove Terminator began releasing singles. His debut album, Road Kill was released February 2000 by Virgin Records. Groove Terminator toured with the rock band, Grinspoon to promote the album. He is also credited with breaking electronic and dance music into regional venues around Australia with fellow DJs Nick Skitz and Bexta.

In 2002, Groove Terminator began releasing music under the title GT. A second album was released in November 2002 under the title Electrifyin' Mojo.

Circa 2005, Lewicki relocated to Los Angeles where he carried on his production and DJ work.

He is also in several other bands; one being Tonite Only with Sam La More which was launched in 2006 and is signed to Hussle Black, a sub-label of Ministry of Sound. In 2009, Lewicki started the electronic rock duo Jump Jump Dance Dance with singer/guitarist Chris Carter, also known as DJ Snakepanther. Jump Jump Dance Dance's debut album was released in July 2011.

In 2012 GT began releasing collaborative singles.

In 2017 and 2018, Groove Terminator toured with Ministry of Sound: Orchestrated, which brought a set of house, rave and club classics arranged for orchestral performance to major venues around Australia.

Lewicki is co-creator of the music festival Block Rocking Beats, which premieres at McLaren Vale, South Australia in December 2019.

Associated Acts
Chili Hi Fly (2000–2002)
Tonite Only (2005–2006)
Jump Jump Dance Dance (2007 – present)

Discography

Studio albums

Singles

Awards

ARIA Music Awards
The ARIA Music Awards is an annual awards ceremony that recognises excellence, innovation, and achievement across all genres of Australian music. Groove Terminator has been nominated for four awards.

|-
| rowspan="2"| 1998
| rowspan="2"| "Losing Ground"
| ARIA Award for Best Video
| 
|-
| ARIA Award for Best New Talent
| 
|-
| rowspan="2"| 2000
| rowspan="2"| Road Kill
| ARIA Award for Best Male Artist
| 
|-
| ARIA Award for Best Cover Art
| 
|-

Associated Acts
Hoops Inc. (c.1995)
Chili Hi Fly (2000–2002)
Tonite Only (2005–2006)
Jump Jump Dance Dance (2007 – present)

References

Australian electronic musicians
Big beat musicians
Musicians from Adelaide
20th-century Australian musicians
21st-century Australian musicians